Cream is the colour of the cream produced by cattle grazing on natural pasture with plants rich in yellow carotenoid pigments, some of which are incorporated into the fresh milk (specifically, the butterfat). This gives a yellow tone to otherwise-white milk at higher fat concentrations (so the colour of dairy cream could be considered partway between the colours of natural cow’s milk and butter). Cream is the pastel colour of yellow, much as pink is to red. By mixing yellow and white, cream can be produced.

The first recorded use of cream as a colour name in English was in 1590.

In nature
Birds
 The cream-coloured courser
 The cream-coloured woodpecker

Mammals
 The cream-coloured giant squirrel

In human culture

Art
 Cream is used as a skin tone in some forms of art, mostly anime. It is also used to describe the general skin tone of East and South East Asia.

Clothing
 Men's white tuxedo jackets are usually a shade of cream or ivory to better stand out against the white dress shirt.

Interior design
 The colour cream is widely used as one of the off-white colours in interior design.

Sports
 The Indiana University Bloomington Hoosiers' official colours are cream and crimson.
 The University of Nebraska Cornhuskers' official colours are scarlet and cream.
The University of Oklahoma Sooners' official colours are crimson and cream.
Club América's original colours are cream and blue, before switching to yellow and blue.
Universitario de Deportes' official colours are cream and burgundy.
Sport Club Corinthians Paulista's first uniform featured cream shirts before switching definitively to white shirts (due to a washing up error), which were kept since then.

See also
 List of colours
 Tints and shades

References

Shades of white
Shades of yellow

hr:Oker